Bell is a lunar impact crater that is located on the far side of the Moon, just past the western limb. It lies in an area of terrain that is marked by many small craters, a number of which are satellite craters of Bell listed in the table below. Bell lies within two crater diameters of Laue to the north, and to the west of the smaller Helberg.

The outer wall of Bell has been worn, eroded, and somewhat reshaped by subsequent impacts. The satellite crater Bell Q lies across the southwest rim, and smaller craters lie across the rim to the north and the east. The interior floor is relatively level, and marked by the crater Bell E which is offset to the east of the midpoint.

Satellite craters
By convention these features are identified on lunar maps by placing the letter on the side of the crater midpoint that is closest to Bell.

References

 
 
 
 
 
 
 
 
 
 
 
 

Impact craters on the Moon